Quattlebaum is a surname. Notable people with the surname include:

A. Marvin Quattlebaum Jr., United States federal judge
Cephas Perry Quattlebaum
C.P. Quattlebaum Office, a historic law office building located at Conway in Horry County, South Carolina
C.P. Quattlebaum House, a historic home located at Conway in Horry County, South Carolina
Paul Quattlebaum House, a historic home located at Conway in Horry County, South Carolina
Doug Quattlebaum (1929–1996), American blues guitarist, singer and songwriter
Robert Quattlebaum

German-language surnames